Mateus de Oliveira Barbosa (Ponte Nova, May 18, 1987), known only by Mateus, is a Brazilian footballer. Acts as a flywheel. Plays by  Vasco da Gama.

Career
Acts as a flywheel. Played by Vasco da Gama.

Career statistics
(Correct )

References

External links
 ogol.com.br

1987 births
Living people
Brazilian footballers
Brazilian expatriate footballers
CR Vasco da Gama players
Esporte Clube Bahia players
Criciúma Esporte Clube players
Ettifaq FC players
Association football midfielders